Bipolar I disorder (BD-I; pronounced "type one bipolar disorder") is a type of bipolar spectrum disorder characterized by the occurrence of at least one manic episode, with or without mixed or psychotic features. Most people also, at other times, have one or more depressive episodes, and all experience a hypomanic stage before progressing to full mania.

It is a type of bipolar disorder and conforms to the classic concept of manic-depressive illness, which can include psychosis during mood episodes.

Diagnosis
The essential feature of bipolar I disorder is a clinical course characterized by the occurrence of one or more manic episodes or mixed episodes. Often, individuals have had one or more major depressive episodes. One episode of mania is sufficient to make the diagnosis of bipolar disorder; the person may or may not have a history of major depressive disorder. Episodes of substance-induced mood disorder due to the direct effects of a medication, or other somatic treatments for depression, substance use disorder, or toxin exposure, or of mood disorder due to a general medical condition need to be excluded before a diagnosis of bipolar I disorder can be made. Bipolar I disorder requires confirmation of only 1 full manic episode for diagnosis, but may be associated with hypomanic and depressive episodes as well. Diagnosis for bipolar II disorder does not include a full manic episode; instead, it requires the occurrence of both a hypomanic episode and a major depressive episode. Serious aggression has been reported to occur in one out of every ten major, first-episode, BD-I patients with psychotic features, the prevalence in this group being particularly high in association with a recent suicide attempt, alcohol use disorder, learning disability, or manic polarity in the first episode.

Bipolar I disorder often coexists with other disorders including PTSD, substance use disorders, and a variety of mood disorders. Up to 40% of people with bipolar disorder also present with PTSD, with higher rates occurring in women and individuals with bipolar I disorder. In addition, the episodes must not be better accounted for by schizoaffective disorder or superimposed on schizophrenia, schizophreniform disorder, delusional disorder, or a psychotic disorder not otherwise specified.

Medical assessment
Regular medical assessments are performed to rule-out secondary causes of mania and depression. These tests include complete blood count, glucose, serum chemistry/electrolyte panel, thyroid function test, liver function test, renal function test, urinalysis, vitamin B12 and folate levels, HIV screening, syphilis screening, and pregnancy test, and when clinically indicated, an electrocardiogram (ECG), an electroencephalogram (EEG), a computed tomography (CT scan), and/or a magnetic resonance imagining (MRI) may be ordered. Drug screening includes recreational drugs, particularly synthetic cannabinoids, and exposure to toxins.

Diagnostic and Statistical Manual of Mental Disorders, 4th Edition (DSM-IV-TR)

Diagnostic and Statistical Manual of Mental Disorders, 5th Edition (DSM-5)
In May 2013, American Psychiatric Association released the fifth edition of the Diagnostic and Statistical Manual of Mental Disorders (DSM-5). There are several proposed revisions to occur in the diagnostic criteria of Bipolar I Disorder and its subtypes. For Bipolar I Disorder 296.40 (most recent episode hypomanic) and 296.4x (most recent episode manic), the proposed revision includes the following specifiers: with psychotic features, with mixed features, with catatonic features, with rapid cycling, with anxiety (mild to severe), with suicide risk severity, with seasonal pattern, and with postpartum onset. Bipolar I Disorder 296.5x (most recent episode depressed) will include all of the above specifiers plus the following: with melancholic features and with atypical features. The categories for specifiers will be removed in DSM-5 and criterion A will add or there are at least 3 symptoms of major depression of which one of the symptoms is depressed mood or anhedonia. For Bipolar I Disorder 296.7 (most recent episode unspecified), the listed specifiers will be removed.

The criteria for manic and hypomanic episodes in criteria A & B will be edited. Criterion A will include "and present most of the day, nearly every day", and criterion B will include "and represent a noticeable change from usual behavior". These criteria as defined in the DSM-IV-TR have created confusion for clinicians and need to be more clearly defined.

There have also been proposed revisions to criterion B of the diagnostic criteria for a Hypomanic Episode, which is used to diagnose For Bipolar I Disorder 296.40, Most Recent Episode Hypomanic. Criterion B lists "inflated self-esteem, flight of ideas, distractibility, and decreased need for sleep" as symptoms of a Hypomanic Episode. This has been confusing in the field of child psychiatry because these symptoms closely overlap with symptoms of attention deficit hyperactivity disorder (ADHD).

ICD-10 
 F31 Bipolar Affective Disorder
 F31.6 Bipolar Affective Disorder, Current Episode Mixed
 F30 Manic Episode
 F30.0 Hypomania
 F30.1 Mania Without Psychotic Symptoms
 F30.2 Mania With Psychotic Symptoms
 F32 Depressive Episode
 F32.0 Mild Depressive Episode
 F32.1 Moderate Depressive Episode
 F32.2 Severe Depressive Episode Without Psychotic Symptoms
 F32.3 Severe Depressive Episode With Psychotic Symptoms

Treatment

Medication
Mood stabilizers are often used as part of the treatment process.
 Lithium is the mainstay in the management of bipolar disorder but it has a narrow therapeutic range and typically requires monitoring
 Anticonvulsants, such as valproate, carbamazepine, or lamotrigine
 Atypical antipsychotics, such as quetiapine, risperidone, olanzapine, or aripiprazole
 Electroconvulsive therapy, a psychiatric treatment in which seizures are electrically induced in anesthetized patients for therapeutic effect

Antidepressant-induced mania occurs in 20–40% of people with bipolar disorder. Mood stabilizers, especially lithium, may protect against this effect, but some research contradicts this. The most effective type of mood stabilizer is Lamotrigine. It is more efficient in helping depression than mania. 

A frequent problem in these individuals is non-adherence to pharmacological treatment; long-acting injectable antipsychotics may contribute to solving this issue in some patients.

A review of validated treatment guidelines for bipolar disorder by international bodies was published in 2020.

Prognosis
Bipolar I usually has a poor prognosis, which is associated with substance abuse, psychotic features, depressive symptoms, and inter-episode depression. A manic episode can be so severe that it requires hospitalization. And estimated 63% of all BP-I related mania results in hospitalization. The natural course of BP-I, if left untreated, leads to episodes becoming more frequent or severe over time. But with proper treatment, individuals with BP-I can lead a healthy lifestyle.

Education
Psychosocial interventions can be used for managing acute depressive episodes and for maintenance treatment to aid in relapse prevention. This includes psychoeducation, cognitive behavioural therapy (CBT), family-focused therapy (FFT), interpersonal and social rhythm therapy (IPSRT), and peer support.

Information on the condition, importance of regular sleep patterns, routines and eating habits and the importance of compliance with medication as prescribed. Behavior modification through counseling can have positive influence to help reduce the effects of risky behavior during the manic phase. Additionally, the lifetime prevalence for bipolar I disorder is estimated to be 1%.

See also 

 List of people with bipolar disorder
 Outline of bipolar disorder
 Bipolar disorder
 Bipolar disorders research
 Bipolar II disorder
 Cyclothymia
 Bipolar NOS
 Borderline personality disorder
 Creativity and bipolar disorder
 Detailed listing of DSM-IV-TR bipolar disorder diagnostics codes
 Emotional dysregulation
 International Society for Bipolar Disorders
 Kleine–Levin syndrome
 Oppositional defiant disorder
 Racing thoughts
 Seasonal affective disorder

References

Bipolar spectrum
Depression (mood)
Mood disorders